Henry Carpenter may refer to:

Henry Bernard Carpenter (1840–1890), clergyman
Henry Boyd-Carpenter (born 1939), solicitor
Henry Carpenter (boxer) (1925–2001), British boxer
Henry le Carpenter, MP for Derby
Henry Carpenter (priest) (1606–1662), Canon of Windsor 1662
Henry Cort Harold Carpenter (1875–1940), British metallurgist

See also
Harry Carpenter (disambiguation)